Alfred Pycock (12 May 1900 – 13 March 1964) was a British swimmer. He competed in the men's 100 metre freestyle event at the 1924 Summer Olympics.

References

External links
 

1900 births
1964 deaths
British male swimmers
Olympic swimmers of Great Britain
Swimmers at the 1924 Summer Olympics
People from Fulham
Sportspeople from London
British male freestyle swimmers
20th-century British people